IEC 60364 Electrical Installations for Buildings is the International Electrotechnical Commission (IEC)'s international standard on electrical installations of buildings. This standard is an attempt to harmonize national wiring standards in an IEC standard and is published in the European Union by CENELEC as "HD 60364". The latest versions of many European wiring regulations (e.g., BS 7671 in the UK) follow the section structure of IEC 60364 very closely, but contain additional language to cater for historic national practice and to simplify field use and determination of compliance by electricians and inspectors. National codes and site guides are meant to attain the common objectives of IEC 60364, and provide rules in a form that allows for guidance of persons installing and inspecting electrical systems. 

The standard has several parts:
 Part 1: Fundamental principles, assessment of general characteristics, definitions
 Part 4: Protection for safety
 Section 41: Protection against electric shock
 Section 42: Protection against thermal effects
 Section 43: Protection against overcurrent
 Section 44: Protection against voltage disturbances and electromagnetic disturbances
 Part 5: Selection and erection of electrical equipment
 Section 51: Common rules
 Section 52: Wiring systems
 Section 53: Isolation, switching and control
 Section 54: Earthing arrangements, protective conductors and protective bonding conductors
 Section 55: Other equipment (Note: Some national standards provide an individual document for each chapter of this section, i.e. 551 Low-voltage generating sets, 557 Auxiliary circuits, 559 Luminaires and lighting installations)
 Section 56: Safety services
 Part 6: Verification
 Part 7: Requirements for special installations or locations
 Section 701: Electrical installations in bathrooms
 Section 702: Swimming pools and other basins
 Section 703: Rooms and cabins containing sauna heaters
 Section 704: Construction and demolition site installations
 Section 705: Electrical installations of agricultural and horticultural premises
 Section 706: Restrictive conductive locations
 Section 708: Electrical installations in caravan parks and caravans
 Section 709: Marinas and pleasure craft
 Section 710: Medical locations
 Section 711: Exhibitions, shows and stands
 Section 712: Solar photovoltaic (PV) power supply systems
 Section 713: Furniture
 Section 714: External lighting
 Section 715: Extra-low-voltage lighting installations
 Section 717: Mobile or transportable units
 Section 718: Communal facilities and workplaces
 Section 721: Electrical installations in caravans and motor caravans
 Section 722: Supplies for Electric Vehicles
 Section 729: Operating or maintenance gangways
 Section 740: Temporary electrical installations for structures, amusement devices and booths at fairgrounds, amusement parks and circuses
 Section 753: Heating cables and embedded heating systems
 Part 8: Functional Aspects
 Section 1: Energy Efficiency
 Section 2: Prosumer’s low-voltage electrical installations
 Section 3: Operation of prosumer’s electrical installations

See also
 Electrical wiring
 Earthing systems
 BS 7671
 AS/NZS 3000

External links 
  All IEC 60364 parts and sections published by the IEC 
  NEMA comparison of IEC 60364 with the US NEC
 How the IEC relates to North America—particularly IEC 60364
 WIKI-Electrical installation guide – According to IEC 60364, Schneider Electric, 2010.
 Online Cable Sizing Tool to IEC 60364-5-52:2009 
 

 
Electric power distribution
60364